Bid Kheyri may refer to:
 Bid Kheyri, Jiroft